Signos Magazine was a Spanish magazine of poetry founded 1986 by Leopoldo Alas Minguez, Luis Cremades, Mario Miguez and Daniel Garbade. Edited first by Ediciones Libertarias and later El Observatorio, it was directed by Leopoldo Alas.  After its closure in 1992, Signos turned into an editorial for contemporary Spanish poetry.

Content 
Signos included poetry by Jean Cocteau, Rafael Alberti, Jaime Gil de Biedma, Rainer María Rilke, Manuel Vásquez Montalbán, Leopoldo María Panero, Ana María Moix, Pere Gimferrer, Vicente Molina Foix, Fernando Savater, Severo Sarduy, or Rafael Sanchez Ferlosio.

Each copy was  illustrated and contained an original drawing. It featured artists like Rafael Alberti, or Daniel Garbade. The originals were presented together with the magazine in exhibitions at the Reina Sofia Museum or the Circulo de Bellas Artes Madrid.

Editions 
 Rafael Alberti, Vicente Molina Foix, Blanca Andreu, Francisco Brines, Daniel Garbade: Signos 1, Editor Libertarias, Madrid 1988, 
 , René Maria Rilke: Signos 3 ,Editor Libertarias, Madrid 1988, ISBN 84 86353 -33-5
 Severo Sarduy, Luis Eduardo Aute: Signos 4, Editor Libertarias, Madrid 1988, 
 Rafael Inglada, Cesar Simón, José Antonio Mesa Torre, Fernando Savater: Signos 5/6, Editor Libertarias, Madrid 1989, 
 Rafael Pérez Estrada, Rafael Sánchez Mazas.Juan Lamillar, Rafael Ballesteros: Signos 7, Editor Libertarias, Madrid 1989, 1989
 Jaime Gil de Biedma, Luis Antonio de Villena, Vicente Huidobro: Signos 8, Editor Libertarias, Madrid 1990
 Rafael Alberti, Jean Cocteau, Sandro Penna: Signos 9/10,Editor Libertarias, Madrid 1988 
 Paul Verlaine, Luis Antonio de Villena: Signos 11/12, Editor Libertarias, Madrid 1988, OCLC:77617403,
 Frederico Leal: El sueño de los días, Madrid 1998, Editor Signos: 
 Leopoldo Alas: La condición y el tiempo, Madrid 1992,

References

1986 establishments in Spain
1992 disestablishments in Spain
Defunct literary magazines published in Europe
Defunct magazines published in Spain
Literary magazines published in Spain
Magazines established in 1986
Magazines disestablished in 1992
Poetry literary magazines
Spanish-language magazines
Spanish poetry